I Am I (stylized I ΛM I) are  an English heavy metal band led by former DragonForce vocalist ZP Theart. The band released their debut album Event Horizon in 2012, followed by two singles, one of which is a cover of John Farnham's "You're the Voice" and the other an original song titled "See You Again". Their sophomore album was expected to be released in November or December 2015, but  has not been released. Reasons for the as of yet 4 year delay to the release of their newest album are currently unknown however since ZP has been prioritising  Skid Row it is presumed that this is the reason. Their website also currently displays a message that reads "IAMI new site coming soon".

History 
The album, Event Horizon, was set to be released on 26 May 2012 with their debut show following the next day at the Birmingham O2 Academy 2. Unfortunately, due to shipping issues, the copies of the album which were available for online purchase only were sent out 5 days late to the disappointment of fans.

On 22 June the band announced via Facebook that they had parted ways with drummer Paul Clark Jr for "Personal Reasons"; this was later removed from the band's official page, though both Clark Jr and Clark Snr (the former's father) who assisted the band in the creation of the debut album maintain to this day that Clark Jr left I AM I due to Theart and co stealing equipment from them.  His replacement Phil Martini joined the band as their new drummer on Friday 20 June 2012. Former Power Quest guitarist Andy Midgley was announced as the new guitar player for I AM I on 18 April 2013 following the departure of Jake Thorsen. Martini failed to show at the band's appearance at Download festival 2013, and has not been seen live with the band since April 2013. The band confirmed Martini's replacement to be Rich Smith, formerly of Power Quest.
 
Although the band had already gone through various line-up changes in its short lifetime, ZP filed this as being 'normal' and 'a process which every band goes through, we (the band) have had media focus because of myself since the beginning'. He also commented saying that if not for his presence in the band, not as much attention would have been paid to the various line-up changes.

On 1 February 2014, it was announced via the members social media pages that guitarists Jacob Ziemba, Andy Midgley and bassist Neil Salmon left the band officially due to "internal struggles and ongoing issues within the band" which all three commented separately to be due to more theft, unpaid work and broken promises.

Event Horizon and "See You Again" (2011–13) 
After ZP Theart left DragonForce in 2010, he took a year off from doing music, but his friends and family encouraged him to get back into the musical scene. He found a group of musicians though YouTube which he felt fitted the idea for the band he wanted for his new project which would be later named I Am I. ZP came across Jacob and Neil whilst looking for other musicians on the internet and was particularly interested in Ziemba's songwriting and playing style. Event Horizon was recorded during late 2011 to early 2012 with the album being released independently on 26 May 2012. I Am I are the first metal band ever to release an album solely on USB.

At their appearance on the main stage at Bloodstock Open Air on 11 August 2012 it was announced that "Event Horizon" would receive a worldwide physical CD and digital release. This would also include a separate Japanese edition of the album which would contain a bonus track titled "Inside of Me".

The album was released through ZeePeeTee LTD in 2012 (Zee Pee Tee being a play on lead vocalist ZP Theart's own name).

During the Access Small Area's UK tour of 2012, the band played a cover of the hit single 'You're The Voice' by John Farnham. A cover version of this song was released at Christmas 2012 from online purchase only.

In 2013, the band released a hard rock power ballad titled "See You Again". Although it did not appear on any charts, it is the band's highest rated and most popular song to date.

Second studio album (2014-present) 
On 15 August 2014, drummer Rich Smith confirmed I Am I is preparing a new album that might be finished by the end of the same year. It was later discovered that this would not be the case, and the album would be finished, and released in 2015, most likely sometime between May and August. The album will be recorded at Abbey Lane Studios in Derby and will "include a collection of hard rock songs, progressive metal tracks, some soft ballads, too", according to Smith. A sneak peek at a new song on the album was made during an advertisement for a tour in late 2014 with Fahran and Ajenda (the song was later revealed to be "We Are One"). It can be seen on their YouTube page, on a video titled "*UPDATE". On 10 August 2015 the band played two songs that will be on the album at Bloodstock Open Air entitled, "Goodbye to Innocence", and "We Are One". Fan-filmed videos of them can be found on YouTube. In an interview with PlanetMosh, Theart said that the album was finished and its release date depended on the label, since the band were still deciding on one, but would most likely be in November or December 2015. This proposed album has not yet received any further coverage or news.

Band members

Current members

 ZP Theart – vocals 
 Rich Smith – drums 
 Andrew Kopczyk  – guitars 
 Gavin Owen – guitars 
 Dean Markham – bass

Former members
 Paul Clark Jr. – drums 
 Jake Thorsen – guitars 
 Phil Martini – drums 
 Jacob Ziemba – guitars 
 Neil Salmon – bass 
 Andy Midgley – guitars

Timeline

Discography

Singles
 "You're the Voice - Single" (2012)
 "See You Again - Single" (2013)

Albums
 Event Horizon (2012)
 Age of Anarchy (TBA)

References

External links 
 

DragonForce
English heavy metal musical groups
English power metal musical groups
Musical groups established in 2012
2012 establishments in England
Musical groups from London